Olivia Ray (born 4 July 1998) is a New Zealand racing cyclist who raced professionally for  in 2021.

Career

In 2022 Ray won the National road race championships in a reduced bunch sprint of six.

In 2021 Olivia won $15,000 in a criterium where she beat the current US criterium champion by 1 second to the line. By December she had not received her prize money.

She was removed from the  roster without explanation in March 2022. According to USADA there is a current investigation into Ray. In July 2022, Ray confessed in an interview to having used the banned substance Clenbuterol at least twice out of competition, claiming that it was under pressure from her then boyfriend. At that point, she was uncertain what penalty USADA would give her, but said she would retire if she received a ban longer than one year.

Major results
2021
 1st  Criterium, National Road Championships
 1st Gravel and Tar La Femme
2022
 1st  Road race, National Road Championships

References

External links

1998 births
Living people
New Zealand female cyclists
Cyclists from Auckland
21st-century New Zealand women